Mark Norman may refer to:

Mark Norman (marine biologist), Australian marine biologist
Mark Norman (DJ) (born 1976),  Dutch producer
Mark Norman (Canadian naval officer), Canadian admiral
Mark Norman (banker), English banker
Marc Norman (born 1941), American screenwriter

See also
Mark Normand, American comedian